This is a partial list of viral music videos, that gained rapid attention on the Internet. Like Internet memes, viewership of such videos tend to expand rapidly and become more widespread because the instant communication facilitates word of mouth.
 
This list documents music videos known to have become viral; other viral videos can be found at list of viral videos with additional videos that have become Internet phenomena for other categories can be found at list of Internet phenomena.

Major music videos

These videos are videos from various artists that have over 500 million views and gained viral popularity after their release.

 "After Like"

 "Ai Se Eu Te Pego" - A Brazilian Portuguese song made popular by the Brazilian singer Michel Teló during the height of the Música sertaneja craze. The international success of the main release of the song made the song go viral. The song peaked at number 81 on the Billboard Hot 100. The music video currently has over 950 million views.

 "Axel F" - A remix of the Beverly Hills Cop theme by Crazy Frog. The song peaked at number 1 in the UK Charts in 2005, as well in different countries in Europe. The song blew up internationally in recent years. Currently, Its music video has over 1.5 billion views on YouTube.

 "Baby Shark Dance" — A children's viral educational music video made by South Korean education brand Pinkfong that went viral due to its poppy and repetitive lyrics. It is currently the most viewed YouTube video, with over 9.3 billion views as of September 2021.
"Bad and Boujee" – A song by rap group Migos. The song became a meme when people made edits on the line "Raindrop, droptop". The video has over 1 billion views. Takeoff's response to being left off the track spawned other memes due to interviewers not being able to hear him.
"Bad Romance"— A song by Lady Gaga.

"Bloody Mary"— A song by Lady Gaga.

 "Despacito" - The official video for "Despacito" on YouTube received its one billionth view on April 20, 2017, after 97 days, becoming the second-fastest video on the site to reach the milestone behind Adele's "Hello". By August 2017, the song was the most viewed YouTube video with 2.9 billion views. Despacito is also the first and fastest video to hit 3, 4, 5, 6 and 7 billion views. The song soared into the top 10 of the Billboard Hot 100 following a Justin Bieber remix. The song also peaked at number 1 for 16 weeks, tying Mariah Carey and Boyz II Men's "One Sweet Day". It is currently the most liked YouTube video, with over 48 million likes as of June 2022.
 "Dilbar" — a remake of 1999 bollywood song of the same name. Being sung by Neha Kakkar, Dhvani Bhanushali and Ikka in Hindi, it features Arabic, Middle Eastern and Moroccan influences. The video features Nora Fatehi performing Arabic Belly dance. A remix version of the song, in three languages: Arabic, French and Hindi was later released, sung by Moroccan-Canadian actress Nora Fatehi in collaboration with Moroccan hip hop group Fnaïre. The remake version has crossed 1.2 billion views on YouTube, as of October 2022.
"Every Breath You Take"
"Eye of the Tiger"

 "Gangnam Style" – A song and music video by South Korean rapper Psy, showing him doing an "invisible horse dance" and saying the catchphrase "Oppa Gangnam Style" across a number of quirky locations, leading to its viral spread as well as the single's reaching international music charts. On YouTube, The video was the first to reach 1 and 2 billion views, and on November 24, 2012, became the most watched video, surpassing Justin Bieber's "Baby" until it was surpassed by Wiz Khalifa's "See You Again" on July 10, 2017. As of December 2022, the video has been viewed over 4.6 billion times on YouTube.
 "Gangsta's Paradise"

 "God's Plan" — A viral song made by Canadian rapper Drake. The lyrics as well as some as the good deeds Drake did throughout the music video allowed for it to go viral and become a meme. The song peaked at number one on the Billboard Hot 100 and has accumulated over 1 billion views on YouTube.
 "Gucci Gang" – A song and music video by American rapper Lil Pump. The song's repetitive hook which repeats the title of the song several times lead the song to become an Internet meme with other people making edits of the song. The song also peaked at number 3 on the Billboard Hot 100, and has accumulated over 890 million views.

 "Havana" — A song by Camila Cabello named after the Cuban city of where she was born. The song is the first song by a female artist since 1996 to top 3 multiple charts on Billboard. The song also peaked at number one on the Billboard Hot 100. The official music video has over 1 billion views on YouTube, while its audio version has over 1.9 billion views as of December 2022.

 "Hello" – Adele's song released in October 2015 was a major digital commercial success being the first song to sell 1 million units within a week of its release. Its video, which primarily features Adele's singing her song through a telephone conversation, led to several mashups with other songs, including Lionel Richie's song of the same name which had a similar theme to its video. Further, as of February 2018, the video holds the record for the fastest time to reach one billion views on YouTube, reaching this within 88 days of its release. As of December 2022, the video has over 3 billion views on YouTube.
"High Hopes"

 "Hot Nigga" – A song by American rapper Bobby Shmurda. The song became popular among Vine users in 2014 and lead to the Shmoney dance meme which has been performed by both Beyoncé and NFL receiver Brandon Gibson. The line "About a week ago!" was also heavily featured in the vines. As of March 2019 the video has 520 million views.

 "Hotline Bling" – A song and video by Drake released in October 2015; the video primarily consists of Drake dancing with female performers against brightly lit backgrounds. Drake's dance style was considered "goofy" and like that "of a total fool", leading to Internet users either resampling the video against other songs they felt more fitting, or themselves recreating the dance.  As of October 2018, the video has over 1.4 billion views on YouTube .
 "I Feel It Coming"

 "Lady Marmalade (Moulin Rouge! version)"

 "Lahore" - A Punjabi Indi-pop single by Guru Randhawa released in December 2017. It was later remade for Street Dancer 3D by the name of "Lagdi Lahore Di" and sung by Guru Randhawa and Tulsi Kumar, which has crossed 400 million views. As of October 2022, the original version has more than 1 billion views.

 "Laung Laachi" - A Punjabi title song of the movie Laung Laachi became the most viewed song video in India, in December 2019, as well as the first music video to hit more than 1 billion views. It is also the most viewed T-Series video (uploaded on ‘T-Series Apna Punjab’).
"Lift Yourself"

 "Look What You Made Me Do" – A song and video by Taylor Swift released on Aug 27, 2017. The song's music video broke the record for most-watched music video within 24 hours by achieving 43.2 million views on YouTube in its first day, topping the 27.7 million views Adele's "Hello" attracted in that timeframe, making it the third most viewed online video in the first 24 hours. It is also the fastest video to reach 200, 300 and 400 million views and the second fastest to reach 100, 500 and 600 million. As of October 2019, the video has over 1.1 billion views on YouTube.

 "Never Gonna Give You Up"

 "Old Town Road" – A song by Lil Nas X that gained popularity in early 2019. It has since become a challenge on the app TikTok, under the "Yeehaw Challenge". The song has received support from Justin Bieber, was played after Texas Tech's win in the NCAA tournament, and played at an Atlanta Hawks basketball game. The popularity of the song has made it peak at number one on the Billboard Hot 100, as well in many other countries. Its longevity on top of the Billboard Hot 100 has made it one of only 12 singles to peak at number one for 13+ weeks. The visualizer has since racked up more than 76 million views on YouTube. A remix with country singer Billy Ray Cyrus was later released, boosting the songs popularity even more. The remix audio has surpassed 550 million views on YouTube. Both versions of the song has made Road the most streamed song in a week in the US with over 143 million streams, surpassing Drake's "In My Feelings" with 116.2 million streams. A music video was later released and starts off in the 1889 and later transitions into 2019. The music video also features several cameos throughout. As of January 2021, its audio version has over 555 million views on YouTube.

 "See You Again" – The official soundtrack of the 2017 film Furious 7 sung by Wiz Khalifa and Charlie Puth . The song was a tribute to Paul Walker, as he died during the production of Furious 7 . The song became very popular, getting to 1 billion views in only 181 days. The song was also briefly the most viewed YouTube video, until it was surpassed by Despacito 24 days later. As of October 2019, the song has over 4.6 billion views, making it currently the fourth most-viewed YouTube video.

 "Single Ladies (Put a Ring on It)" - A song and video released by Beyoncé in October 2008. The music video, shot in black and white, features Beyoncé wearing a one-shoulder black leotard surrounded by two backup dancers performing the choreography that would lead to the video's popularity. The video is credited with starting the "first major dance craze of both the new millennium and the Internet". Many celebrities have parodied and paid homage to the song and the video including former president Barack Obama, Tom Hanks, Joe Jonas, Kourtney Kardashian, Khloé Kardashian, and Kim Kardashian, and Chris Colfer and Heather Morris included the dance routine as part of Glee Live! In Concert!. As of March 2019, the video has over 690 million views on YouTube.
 "Starboy"

 "Thank u, Next" — A 2018 song by Ariana Grande which its music video was released on November 30. The song topped the Billboard Hot 100. The song reached 100 million views in 3 days and 10 hours, becoming one of the fastest to do so. It also reached 55.4 million views within 24 hours, breaking both the YouTube and Vevo 24 hour records.  The music video features celebrities Colleen Ballinger, Jonathan Bennett, Stefanie Drummond, Scott Nicholson, Troye Sivan and Gabi DeMartino. It also referenced the movies Mean Girls, Bring It On, 13 Going on 30 and Legally Blonde. As of January 2021, the music video has over 605 million views on YouTube.
 "The Duck Song" – A 2009 children's song accompanying a rudimentary Microsoft Paint animation that went viral shortly after its release on YouTube. Within three years the video received nearly 90 million views. As of October 2021, the video has over 500 million views.

 "The Fox (What Does the Fox Say?)" – A 2013 song and associated video by the Norwegian comedy duo Ylvis prepared for their television show. The song's verses note the noises other animals make, but in the chorus, ask what noise a fox makes, at which point the song offers nonsense phrases like "gering-ding-ding-ding-dingeringeding!" and "fraka-kaka-kaka-kaka-kow!", while the video takes a similarly funny turn. The video saw over 43 million hits within a few weeks of its release, topping music charts, and leading to Ylvis being signed for more music by Warner Bros. Records. As of June 2020, the video has over 1 billion views on YouTube.

 "The Gummy Bear Song" – A bubblegum dance song by Gummibär that has become a viral sensation and was the first song by a German independent artist to gain 1 billion views. As of March 2019, the video has over 1.6 billion views on YouTube.

 "This is America" – A viral song by Childish Gambino. The video talks about the state of America. The video also makes other references throughout. The way Glover walks in the beginning is representative of Jim Crow. His movements represent minstrel shows, a form of entertainment that mocks African-American people. The video also references the 2015 Charleston Church massacre, the use of phones to record police officers shooting blacks, the book of Revelation, other things relating to cars, and Get Out. The video also surpassed 12.9 million views in under 24 hours, and 50 million in 3 days.  The music video currently has over 510 million views.

 "Turn Down for What" – A 2014 song and video by record producer DJ Snake and rapper Lil Jon which gained viral popularity due to its bass drop after Lil Jon yells "Turn Down For What!". As of March 2019, the video has over 840 million views on YouTube.

 "Watch Me (Whip/Nae Nae)" - A viral video by Silentó with own set of unique moves imitated by other fans. The song peaked at No. 3 on the Billboard Hot 100 chart. As of March 2019, the song has accumulated over 1.6 billion views."

Other music videos

Originals

This section includes music videos with less than 500 million views.
 "1-800-273-8255"
 "2 Phút Hơn"
 "Badgers" — A viral song and video by MrWeebl featuring badgers jumping up and down accompanied with catchy lyrics.  The dancing badgers helped Picking's website Weebl's Stuff win a People's Choice award from users of Yahoo! in the UK.

 "Bed Intruder Song" – A remix by the Gregory Brothers of a televised news interview of Antoine Dodson, the brother of a victim of a home invasion and attempted assault. The music video became a mainstream success, reaching the Billboard Hot 100, and became the most watched YouTube video of 2010. The video also coined the phrase "Hide yo kids, hide yo wife," that later became a meme.

 "Bitch Lasagna" - A song by the Swedish YouTuber Pewdiepie in collaboration with Dutch music producer Party In Backyard. The song satirizes Indian music label T-Series and used racism and Indian-stereotypes, as a response to predictions that T-Series would surpass PewDiePie in terms of subscriber count which soon became true. And was later banned in India by Delhi High Court. The song was one of the first events in the PewDiePie vs T-Series competition, in which the two channels competed for the title of the most-subscribed channel on YouTube.
 "Chacarron Macarron" - Song by Panamanian artists Rodney Clark (El Chombo) and Andres de la Cruz (also known as Andy's Val Gourmet). It is a reworking of the original version from 2003 by Andy's Val Gourmet, who is credited as 'Andy's Val' on the release. The song gained attention online when the chorus was used on a YTMND page by the name of "Ualuealuealeuale" which was created sometime in late 2005. Chacarron Macarron became viral on the Internet owing to its nonsensical lyrics and odd music video.

 "Chinese Food" - A song and music video by Alison Gold recorded with the controversial ARK Music Factory, the same company behind Rebecca Black's viral song "Friday". The song was called "The New Friday" as well as being called racist.

 "Chocolate Rain" – A song and music video written and performed by Tay Zonday (also known as Adam Nyerere Bahner). After being posted on YouTube on 22 April 2007, the song quickly became a popular viral video. By December 2009, the video had received over 40 million views. As of October 2018, the song has over 119 million views.

 "Congratulations" - A song by Swedish YouTuber Pewdiepie, Swedish singer/musician Roomie and English musician Boyinaband. The single was self-released on 31 March 2019 with an accompanying music video on YouTube as a response to T-Series surpassing PewDiePie as the most subscribed channel on YouTube. The music video is banned on YouTube India.

"Crab Rave" – A song and music video written and animated by Irish DJ and music producer Eoin O'Broin (known as his stage name Noisestorm). Although the song was initially released as an April Fool's Day joke for the Canadian record label Monstercat, it soon gained popularity because of the music video featuring thousands of computer-animated dancing crabs. The song peaked at number 32 in the "Hot Dance/Electronic Songs" category in the Billboard charts, surpassed over 1 million (U.S) online streams in the week ending November 22, 2018, and gained over 50 million views on the "Monstercat: Instinct" YouTube channel.

"Da Coconut Nut" - A song by Filipino national artist Ryan Cayabyab originally popularized by the band Smokey Mountain in 1991.

"Dat $tick" – A song by Indonesian rapper, Rich Brian. This song went viral after many rappers react to this song.

 "Don't Drop That Thun Thun" - A song and viral video by The FiNATTiCZ. The song became popular to a twerking mashup of the song posted on Vine. The song peaked at No. 35 on the Billboard Hot 100.

 "Firework" - Katy Perry Jodi DiPiazza duet" -A duet from the television special Night of Too Many Stars, it received 4 Million views in the first 4 days and was the most viral video on YouTube for a short period of time.

 "Friday" – A 2011 music video sung by 13-year-old Rebecca Black, partially funded by her mother, which received over 200 million views on YouTube and spread in popularity through social media services.

 "Gokuraku Jodo" – A J-pop song by Japanese pop duo Garnidelia. The song was released on July 28, 2016 accompanied with a dance music video. It spread to the Chinese video website Bilibili and quickly became viral in China, leading to various spoofs and mimicking dances. As of 27 June 2020, the video received 63 million hits on YouTube.

 "Gwiyomi" – A K-pop single by the South Korean indie musician Hari. The song was released on 18 February 2013 and is based on an Internet meme known as the Gwiyomi Player, which was invented in October 2012 by the K-pop idol Jung Il Hoon and has inspired many similar versions uploaded onto the Internet by Asian netizens.

 "It's Everyday Bro" – A song by actor and YouTube personality Jake Paul which went viral due to a line by Nick Crompton which stated England was a city. The video accumulated over 216 million views and has become the third most disliked YouTube video.
"Комбайна вършачка (latinized: Kombaĭna vŭrshachka)" - An official music video for a song by Bulgarian folk band Оркестър Камчиa (latinized: Orkestŭr Kamchi) about a combine harvester. It first became viral on TikTok in Bulgaria and other Balkan countries in August 2022, mostly because of the line "На китарата Васко Жабата, той ще свири, драги гости само за вас." (translation: "On the guitar there's Vasko the frog, he's playing just for you, dear guests.") In September 2022, the song became globally known.
"Lolly Bomb" - An official music video by Russian rave band Little Big. It featured the fictional love story of Howard X, an impersonator of Kim Jong-Un, where he fell in love with a missile. The music video has amassed over 122 million views on YouTube.
"Manike Mage Hithe" - A viral cover of a Sri Lankan song, sung by Yohani and Satheeshan Rathnayaka. It has crossed 226 million views on YouTube and has got widespread recognition in Sri Lanka, India and abroad.

 "Mine" - A viral song and meme by Bazzi. The video created the meme "You so fuckin' precious when you smile" from a lyric in the song. The song also peaked at number 11 on the Billboard Hot 100 and the music video has over 130 million views on YouTube.

 "Toy" - Israeli singer Netta Barzilai won 2018 Eurovision Song Contest with her song Toy. The song has become viral, it was played on many European radio stations and it's currently the most watched video on the official Eurovision YouTube channel.

 OK Go music videos – Several of the band's award-winning videos incorporate unique concepts, such as dancing on treadmills in "Here It Goes Again", a giant Rube Goldberg machine in "This Too Shall Pass", or a choreographed one-shot routine using over a dozen trained dogs in "White Knuckles". As such, they often go viral within a few days of their release. Their music video for "The Muppet Show Theme Song" won a Webby Award for "Viral Video" in 2012.

 "One Pound Fish" – A sales pitch song written and sung by Muhammad Shahid Nazir, a fish stall vendor in London, that became a viral hit and led to Nazir getting a recording contract.

 "Pants on the Ground" – First sung by "General" Larry Platt during the season 9 auditions of American Idol in Atlanta, Georgia, on 13 January 2010. Within one week, the video was seen by approximately 5 million on YouTube, had over 1 million fans on Facebook, and was repeated on television by Jimmy Fallon and Brett Favre.

 "Rappin' For Jesus" –  A song by Pastor & Mrs. Jim Colerick. The video was made to promote a Christian youth outreach program. The video features Pastor & Mrs. Colerick rapping about how to be a Christian. The video went viral because of the line "That's cause Jesus Christ is my nigga" which many took as a racial slur. Due to this and the strange nature of the video, it gained over 47 million views.

 "Red Solo Cup" – Toby Keith's recording of a drinking song devoted to the Solo disposable cup became a viral hit, with the video logging over 49 million views on YouTube and the song eventually becoming Keith's biggest hit on the Billboard Hot 100.

 "Shia LaBeouf Live" – A song by singer-songwriter Rob Cantor that depicts Shia LaBeouf as a cannibal who kills people for sport. Due to the ridiculous manner of the song, the song went viral and has accumulated over 57 million views.

 "Tenda Biru" – A song by Indonesian actress Desy Ratnasari that depicts her doing Mannequin Challenge. As of 2023, it has over 64 million views.

 "United Breaks Guitars" – A video by the band Sons of Maxwell, recounting how United Airlines broke a guitar belonging to band member Dave Carroll. The video reached 11 million views, was named one of the top ten of 2009, and created speculation that it had caused a $180 million drop in the airline's stock value.

 "What What (In the Butt)" – A viral music video set to a song about anal sex by gay recording artist Samwell. The video was posted on Valentine's Day 2007, and two weeks later had already been viewed 500,000 times. It was subsequently parodied on the South Park episode, "Canada on Strike", which poked fun at several other Internet memes and personalities.
 "Who Let the Dogs Out"
 " You'll Cowards Don't Even Smoke Crack" - The title track from You'll Cowards Don't Even Smoke Crack gained over 3 million views.

Interpretations

 "Kids with Down syndrome singing A Thousand Years" — A viral interpretation of A Thousand Years sung by kids with Down syndrome. The video was shared on Twitter by the song's author, Christina Perri. The video currently has over 4.8 million views, and was for World Down Syndrome Day.

 "Canon Rock" – A rock arrangement of the Canon in D by JerryC which became famous when covered by funtwo and others.

"Hey" – In 2005 two 20yo Israeli film school students Tasha and Disha filmed their fun dance and lip-synch to the song Pixies released as a track on album Doolittle in 1989. One of the first truly viral YouTube videos, viewed over 34 million times.  At a result of a viral success girls met the Pixies at the 2014 and the group did the video clip to a new song with now 30yo "youtube sensation girls" as a main characters for a video.

 "Howard The Alien" - A green screen video of an alien dancing to Money Longer by Lil Uzi Vert. The original green screen video was uploaded to YouTube by the "3D Animation Land" channel in December 2017. It began gaining attention when an iFunny post combined the animation with Money Longer with the caption "imagine having sleep paralysis and seeing this as the foot of bed just fuckin breakin it down and you cant do anything about it like you hear the music in the back and everything bruh."

 "I Dreamed a Dream" by Susan Boyle - In 2009, Boyle, an unknown singer, 47 at the time, auditioned for Britain's Got Talent with the song surprising the jury, the public and the world with her interpretation. The programme received high ratings and Boyle's performance was quickly added to sites such as YouTube, where millions of people viewed it in the first month alone.

 "The Muppets: Bohemian Rhapsody" – A 2009 music video featuring The Muppets performing a modified version of Queen's "Bohemian Rhapsody". The video received over seven million hits within its first week of release on YouTube, and by 2012, it had earned over 25 million hits. The video won the "Viral Video" category in the 14th Annual Webby Awards.

 "Numa Numa" with Gary Brolsma video of Romanian song "Dragostea din tei" by O-Zone. The video released on December 6, 2004, on the website Newgrounds.com, shows Brolsma lip-synching the hit song with lively gesticulations and dance moves.

 "Pop Culture" – A 2011 YouTube video of a live mash-up by the musician Hugo Pierre Leclercq aka "Madeon", aged 17 at the time, using a Novation touchpad to mix samples from 39 different songs. The video went viral within a few days of being posted, and led to Leclercq's fame in the electronica music genre.

"Redbone" by girl selling Girl Scout cookies - A video by a 6-year-old girl and her father where they were trying to sell Girl Scout cookies. The popularity of the song led to the sales of her cookies skyrocketing. The popularity of the song also led her to appear on The Late Show with Stephen Colbert with the artist of the original song, Donald Glover. 

 "Space Oddity" by Canadian astronaut Chris Hadfield - Performed and recorded during a space mission on Soyuz TMA-07M. The cover of the famous David Bowie song is set in zero gravity against spectacular views of Earth with Hadfield singing and playing the guitar. The video also generated a great deal of media exposure.

 "Twelve Days of Christmas" by a cappella group Straight No Chaser went viral in 2007 and led to the group being signed by Atlantic Records.

 "We Are the World 25 for Haiti (YouTube edition)" is a massively collaborative crowdsourced charity video, involving 57 geographically distributed unsigned or independent contributors, that was produced by Canadian singer-songwriter and YouTube personality Lisa Lavie to raise money for victims of 12 January 2010 Haiti earthquake. The video received repeated coverage on CNN, and the video's participants were collectively named ABC News "Persons of the Week" on U.S. national television by television journalist Diane Sawyer in March 2010.

"Yodeling Walmart Boy" — A video of Mason Ramsey yodeling to Lovesick Blues in his local Walmart. The song and video went viral and led him to become a celebrity. This version also made the original song peak at number 3 on the Spotify Top 50 viral charts. The song also led Mason to be on The Ellen DeGeneres Show, have a concert at his own Walmart, and perform at the Coachella Valley Music and Arts Festival.

 "Xue hua piao piao bei feng xiao xiao" — A selfie video of a bald Chinese man singing the chorus verse of Fei Yu-ching's song Yi jian mei in a snowy background, first uploaded to Kuaishou in January 2020, was shared to Western social media, and quickly became viral on TikTok and Spotify by May 2020, leading to various covers and spoofs.

Ads and campaigns

 "Dumb Ways to Die" – A music video featuring "a variety of cute characters killing themselves in increasingly idiotic ways" that went viral through sharing and social media. It was part of a public service announcement advertisement campaign by Metro Trains in Melbourne, Australia to promote rail safety.

 Mandatory Fun album and the #8days8videos campaign – A viral marketing campaign by comedy singer/songwriter "Weird Al" Yankovic to promote his 2014 album Mandatory Fun by releasing eight videos for the new album over eight consecutive days across different streaming providers. The Internet-aided approach was considered very successful, leading to the album to become Yankovic's first number one hit in his 32-year career and became the first comedy album to hit Number 1 on the Billboard charts in over 50 years.

Beat Energy Gap - a 2017 advertisement originally produced by Nestlé Philippines to promote the product, MILO, with actor James Reid as the endorser. The success of the advertisement and the song's catchy lyrics and upbeat theme led many internet users to make parodies featuring the song. One notable example of this is remixing K-pop videos to the song.

Dance phenomena

 "Crank That (Soulja Boy)" - Debut single by American rapper Soulja Boy (2007) and is accompanied by the "Soulja Boy dance". The song is recognized by its looping steel drum riff.  The song also peaked at number one on the Billboard Hot 100. As of February 2018, the video has over 330 million views on YouTube.

 "STOOPID (6ix9ine)" - Single by American rapper 6ix9ine and is accompanied by the "STOOPID dance". The song ended up being used in many memes, and also became into a viral dance challenge on TikTok.

 Dame Tu Cosita - A viral dance song made by Panamanian rapper El Chombo that originated on social media platform Musical.ly. The video features a green alien dancing. It is accompanied with the #DameTuCosita challenge, which features people trying to recreate the dance.

 "Dancing Banana" – An animated banana dancing to the song "Peanut Butter Jelly Time" by the Buckwheat Boyz.

 Ghetto Kids of Uganda dancing "Sitya Loss" - A viral song of Ugandan singer Eddy Kenzo who featured the four Ugandan boys Alex Ssempijja, Fred and Isaac Tumusiime, Bashir Lubega and the girl Patricia Nabakooza dancing improvised moves in a competitive manner to his song. The video was made by Big Talent Entertainment and JahLive Films, and was directed by Mugerwa Frank.

 Hampster Dance – A page filled with hamsters dancing, linking to other animated pages. It spawned a fictional band complete with its own CD album release.

 Harlem Shake – A video based on Harlem shake dance, originally created by YouTube personality Filthy Frank and using an electronica version of the song by Baauer. In such videos, one person is dancing or acting strange among a room full of others going about routine business, until after the drop and a video cut, everyone starts dancing or acting strangely. The attempts to recreate the dance has led to a viral spread on YouTube.

 "Hit the Quan" — A viral song by iLoveMemphis that started the #HitTheQuanChallenge, resulting in people dancing to the video. The song peaked at number 15 on the Billboard Hot 100. The music video currently has over 57 million views on YouTube.

 "Indian Thriller" – A viral scene from the Indian film Donga with added subtitles phonetically approximating the original lyrics as English sentences.

 In My Feelings — A 2018 song by Drake from his recent studio album. The song went viral thanks to the "In My Feelings Challenge" (Also known as the Do The Shiggy Challenge). The challenge was replicated by many celebrities, such as football player Odell Beckham Jr., actor Will Smith, hosts Kelly & Ryan from the talk show Live with Kelly and Ryan and many others. The popularity of the dance challenge led to the song peaking on top of the Billboard Hot 100.

 JK Wedding Entrance Dance – The wedding procession for Jill Peterson and Kevin Heinz of St. Paul, Minnesota, choreographed to the song Forever by Chris Brown. Popularized on YouTube with 1.75 million views in less than five days in 2009. The video was later imitated in an episode of The Office on NBC.

 "Juju on That Beat (TZ Anthem)" - A viral song and meme made by two Detroit teenagers Zay Hilfigerrr & Zayion McCall. Many people have tried to replicate their dance moves, with the #TZAnthem Challenge. The song charted on Billboard Hot 100, peaking at number 5.

 Little Superstar – A video of King kong, a short Indian actor, break-dancing to MC Miker G & DJ Sven's remix of the Madonna song "Holiday", in a clip from a 1990 Tamil film Adhisaya Piravi, featuring actor Rajnikanth.

 Passinho do Romano - The dance was born in the east of São Paulo, Brazil, known initially by Passinho do Romano. Because it was created in Jardim Romano in the region of Itaim Paulista. A dance that consists basically of light steps, with soft uses of heels, free arms with break, dubstep, robot steps and funk itself gained strength in the community and quickly became popular.

 Rolex - Viral song made by duo Ayo & Teo. The song is accompanied with the #RolexChallenge, which features people trying to replicate the dance. The song peaked at number 20 on the Billboard Hot 100, and has over 350 million views.

 Scooby Doo Papa — A viral song and dance video made by New York DJ DJ Kass. Many people have tried to recreate the dance on social media. The song also peaked at number 9 on the Billboard Hot Latin chart.

 "Skibidi" – A song and viral music video by Russian rave band Little Big. The release sparked a dance craze in part to the "Skibidi Challenge" issued by the band. The video went viral days after release, gaining 28 million views in 2 weeks.

 Techno Viking – A Nordic raver dancing in a technoparade in Berlin.

 "Thriller" by the CPDRC Dancing Inmates – A recreation of Michael Jackson's hit performed by prisoners at the Cebu Provincial Detention and Rehabilitation Center (CPDRC) in the Philippines. As of January 2010, it is among the ten most popular videos on YouTube with over 20 million hits.

Music phenomena

 Anime Music Videos/MADs – A staple of anime conventions both in Japan and Western countries, these fan-made videos take footage from other anime works and re-edit them in separate order, addition of new soundtracks (including to full-length songs), and other manipulations such as lip-syncing characters to lyrics; with the propagation of the Internet and popularity of anime in the United States in 2003, this type of user-created content developed, and extend to include footage from other works including video games and Western animation.

 80's remix – A series of videos where contemporary pop music is reinterpreted as songs released during the 1980s.

 Sergey Stepanov, aka Epic Sax Guy – A Moldovan musician who quickly gained Internet attention after performing in the Eurovision Song Contest 2010 as part of the SunStroke Project. The performance of Stepanov miming a saxophone solo of Moldova's entry has been remixed and looped for ten hours. The group have embraced the Internet attention and has mentioned 'Epic Sax Guy' in some of their singles, including a single called 'Epic Sax'. In the 2017 contest, SunStroke Project returned with Stepanov, who later played the signature riff live during an interview.

 Hurra Torpedo – A Norwegian band whose coast-to-coast tour was a viral campaign to promote the Ford Fusion car.

 Lip dub – Although lip dubbing in music videos was not a new concept, Jake Lodwick, the co-founder of Vimeo, coined the term "lip dubbing" on December 14, 2006, in a video entitled Lip Dubbing: Endless Dream. Lodwick subsequently directed the "Flagpole Sitta" "office lip dub" in April 2007, which The Washington Post covered. vSince then, dozens of lip dubs have been coordinated around the world by students. After L'Université du Québec à Montréal (UQAM) produced a lip dub to The Black Eyed Peas' "I Gotta Feeling" in 2009, the viral video phenomenon gained international acclaim.

 Lucian Piane, aka RevoLucian – Created several popular celebrity techno remixes, including a spoof on actor Christian Bale titled "Bale Out"

 Literal music video – Covers of music videos where the original lyrics have been replaced with ones that literally describe the events that occur in the video, typically disconnected with the original lyrics of the song.

 Nightcore - A type of music that started as a subgenre of trance and is still considered so by many people. Nightcore is characterized by a sped-up melody (sometimes), fast rhythmic beat (usually), and always higher than normal pitch. Almost all nightcore music are original songs nightcored (remixed into nightcore) by nightcore fans. Nightcore was introduced in 2002 and began its spread to the internet in mid 2005.

 "Pink Season" - An album by artist and YouTube personality Filthy Frank, under his "Pink Guy" persona. The album consists of various tracks that are often overly vulgar and comedic. The album went viral on its release and soared to the top of the iTunes charts.

 Rickrolling – A phenomenon involving posting a URL in an Internet forum that appears to be relevant to the topic at hand, but is, in fact, a link to a video of Rick Astley's "Never Gonna Give You Up". The practice originated on 4chan as a "Duckroll", in which an image of a duck on wheels was what was linked to. The practice of Rickrolling became popular after April Fools' Day in 2008 when YouTube rigged every feature video on its home page to Rick Astley's song.

 "Sandstorm" – A phenomenon which involves answering a question about a song's name, e.g. in the comments of a YouTube video, with Darude's 1999 song "Sandstorm", no matter what the song in the video is.

 "You Reposted in the Wrong Neighborhood " – A mashup by SHOKK 青 of Shake That by Eminem featuring Nate Dogg and Casin by glue70. The song went viral when the remixes' instrumental was put to other songs.

 009 Sound System - An electronic music project by Alexander Perls that gained popularity on YouTube after its implementation of the AudioSwap system on the website, which replaced copyrighted music with a Creative Commons licensed track. Since the track names were in alphabetical sorting, 009 Sound System tracks were first on the list, which made them the most used ones. Most popular tracks were "With a Spirit", "Dreamscape", "Holy Ghost", "Space and Time" and others. During the AudioSwap era of YouTube, users reacted negatively to these songs being very frequent on the site, but in YouTube's later days, "With a Spirit" became the site's unofficial anthem, as considered by users. It's an important aspect when referring to YouTube's Golden Era, along with low-resolution, low-framerate desktop capture videos (usually captured with the unregistered version of the software HyperCam 2), Club Penguin tutorials, mostly about hacking the game's currency, with the tutorial steps being written in Notepad, footage edited with Windows Movie Maker (usually using poor grammar and loudly colored characters in different fonts) and clickbait titles among others.

Others

 "All Star" – A song by rock band Smash Mouth known for its appearance in the 2001 film Shrek and its opening line "Somebody once told me". These two factors led the song to become a meme often associated with Shrek. The song has also been a large part of mashup culture, often being mashed up with various songs. The band has also embraced the song's memes.

 "Big Enough" - An EDM country song by Kirin J. Callinan. The music video for the song portrays Jimmy Barnes as a giant screaming cowboy in the sky. The video went viral when the sound of Barnes screaming was put over other screams in pop culture.

 "Chum Drum Bedrum" – A video of Russian singer Vitas performing the 7th Element. The video went viral due to Vitas singing gibberish such as "Blr ha ha ha" which led to Vitas being known as "The Weird Russian Singer".

 "Father Stretch My Hands Pt. 1" – A song by rapper Kanye West. Metro Boomin's signature producer tag, "If Young Metro don't trust you I'm gonna shoot ya" and entrance inspired various Vines and Memes about the song, usually involving somebody shooting a gun.

 "Fireflies" – A 2009 song by Owl City that became revived as a meme in May 2017. In the meme, the song would play in random clips. The song received further notability in June 2017 when Owl City was asked to interpret the lyric "I get a thousand hugs from 10,000 lightning bugs."

 "For The Damaged Coda" – A 2000 song from alternative rock band Blonde Redhead popularlized by animated television series Rick And Morty spawned memes after the song was placed over sad moments in popular culture.

 "Lazy Sunday" – A 2005 Saturday Night Live sketch written and performed by Andy Samburg and Chris Parnell in which the two engage in a hip-hop song about their plans for a lazy Sunday afternoon. The song was uploaded by fans to YouTube, at that time a relative small, new site, and had been watched by millions of users before it was taken down as a copyright violation by NBC. This created the idea of being able to provide reuse of television material on the Internet, giving shows a second life, and is stated to have established YouTube as a potential revenue source for television networks, contributing towards Google's purchase of the site for $1.6 billion in 2006.

 "Man's Not Hot" – A freestyle rap by British comedian Michael Dapaah. The freestyle features Dapaah saying unintelligible phrases and words which made the video into a meme which was remixed with various songs.

 "Mooo!" – A 2018 novelty song by American rapper Doja Cat who sings "Bitch I'm a cow / I'm not a cat / I don't go meow". The music video was filmed with a DIY green screen made out of a bed sheet and has gained over 72 million views on YouTube.

 "Nyan Cat" – A video of an animated cat running through space, accompanied with a UTAU song which the lyrics are simply "Nyanyanyanyanyanyanya!". The video went viral after bloggers started reposting the song.

 "Pokemon Go Song" – A song by YouTube personality Mishovy Silenosti. The video has surpassed 2.5 million views and has become one of the most disliked YouTube videos.

 "Pokémon Theme Music Video" – A video featuring Ian Hecox and Anthony Padilla lip-syncing to the original English Pokémon theme song. The video became the most viewed video on YouTube at the time before it was removed. The success of their Pokémon video and other videos led Smosh to be featured in the "Person of the Year: You" issue of Time Magazine, published December 13, 2006 and on Time.com.

 "PPAP (Pen-Pineapple-Apple-Pen)" – A Japanese earworm-style music video performed by Pikotaro.

" 1, 2, Oatmeal" - A song originally published in German to the tune of Gourmet Race from Kirby Super Star. A few years later, it was translated into English. The translation is out of key and does not follow the format of the song; however, each verse repeats.

 "Redbone" - A 2016 song by music artist Childish Gambino. In early 2017, the song became a popular meme consisting of various remixes of the song to fit a certain theme.

 "Shooting Stars" – A 2009 song by Australian band Bag Raiders that went viral in 2017. The song is usually accompanied with people falling with surreal, spacey backgrounds. The meme has since been acknowledged by the band itself.
"Super Max!" – A 2016 song by Dutch Max Verstappen fan group The Pitstop Boys. The song and music video gained popularity during Verstappen's 2021 title run in Formula One.

 "Surrender to Me" - A song recorded, but never released, by former Boston drummer William "Curly" Smith in 1978. In January 2022, Curly's son, Zach, discovered the song and posted a video on TikTok about the discovery. After it gained popularity, Zach and Curly would then release "Surrender to Me" as a single under the name "FireCityFunk" in February 2022, as well as appearing and performing the song on Jimmy Kimmel Live!.
 Trololo – A 1976 televised performance of Russian singer Eduard Khil lip-syncing the song I Am Glad to Finally Be Home (Я очень рад, ведь я, наконец, возвращаюсь домой). The video's first mainstream appearance was on The Colbert Report, on 3 March 2010; since then, its popularity has escalated, occasionally being used as part of a bait-and-switch prank, similar to Rickrolling.

 To Be Continued – A series of short clips set to "Roundabout" by the progressive rock band Yes culminating with a "To Be Continued" card for humorous effect. A parody of a standard ending of the anime JoJo's Bizarre Adventure.

 "Tunak Tunak Tun" – A 1998 song by Indian artist Daler Mehndi. The music video of the song features multiple images of Mehndi green screened over computer-generated landscapes. The reason why this was done were the critics, who complained that Mehndi's music was only popular because his music videos featured beautiful women dancing. Mehndi's response was to create a video that featured only himself.

 "When Mama Isn't Home" – A video of a father playing trombone and a son playing an oven door to the song 'Freaks' by Timmy Trumpet and Savage in October, 2014. The video went viral on Vine and YouTube, and the father and son appeared on Morning TV talk shows and travelled to Europe to film a TV commercial for Hewlett Packard. The song went on to become a charting success reaching the Billboard viral charts Top 10, 6 x platinum status in Australia and number 1 in Savage's home country, New Zealand.

 "We Are Number One"– A 2014 song by Stefán Karl Stefánsson (in character as Robbie Rotten) from the children's show LazyTown. In late 2016, the song went viral after Stefán Karl was diagnosed with pancreatic cancer.

The Most Mysterious Song on the Internet - A New wave song which aired on a German radio station in 1984 thought to originate from a European band. Who created this song and the song's name in question is unknown. The mission to find the song gained popularity in 2019 after a Brazilian Reddit user asked the website if they knew of the song's origins.
Cbat - A 2011 song that got popular from a Reddit user who stated that he used the song during sex, and his girlfriend was turned off by it.

See also

 Internet meme
 List of Internet phenomena
 List of viral videos
 Viral marketing

References

Viral videos

viral
2